"Jump in the Line (Shake, Senora)" is a calypso song composed by Lord Kitchener and best known from a version recorded by vocalist Harry Belafonte in 1961.

Later renditions
Woody Herman and his Third Herd recorded Kitchener's song in 1952 for Mars Records; Herman's band recorded it live that same year with the title "Jump in Line."  Lord Invader released a cover of the song on the Folkways Label in 1955, titled "Labor Day (Jump in the Line)". His rendition reached mento star Lord Flea, who in turn recorded a version based on Lord Invader's interpretation.  It was released on August 1, 1958, by Capitol Records.

Flea's version inspired Harry Belafonte, who released his own take on November 17, 1961 (credited to his pseudonym Raymond Bell on the disc label).  It was included on the album Jump Up Calypso, and was later recorded by Lord Fly and Joseph Spence in 1958.

Perhaps its most memorable appearance is in the 1988 Tim Burton comedy horror film Beetlejuice during the movie's end. This occurrence would later resurface in the Broadway musical stage adaptation in 2019 as the finale.

In 1998, the song was covered by American swing band the Cherry Poppin' Daddies for the soundtrack to David Zucker's comedy film BASEketball. A decade later, the song was performed by Samuel E. Wright, Kevin Michael Richardson, Rob Paulsen, Jim Cummings, Alvin Chea, Oren Waters, Rick Logan and Chris Garcia in The Little Mermaid: Ariel's Beginning. The song was sampled by Pitbull as "Shake Señora" off the 2011 album Planet Pit. That same year, a 2004 recording of the song by Karl Zero and The Wailers (released on Zero's album, HiFi Calypso) was used in Diary of a Wimpy Kid: Rodrick Rules. 

The track appears in Just Dance 2 from its original artist. This song was also featured in Uncle Dane's return video Impractical Engineering. This song would also appear in Paddington 2's end credits. Harry Belafonte's rendition of the song went viral on video-sharing app TikTok in August 2019.

The song inspired the 1962 Gary U.S. Bonds hit single "Twist, Twist Senora".

In 2009, in season 8 of Dancing with the Stars, Steve Wozniak and Karina Smirnoff danced a Samba with this song, that got a 10 out of 30, the second lowest score in the history of the show. It was the only dance that got 3s or less and was not the celebrity's final dance. Other celebrities and professionals danced a Samba to this song in other seasons, such as Ricki Lake in 2011 who got a 30.

Certifications and sales

References

Songs about dancing
Harry Belafonte songs
1961 singles
Calypso songs
1946 songs